Simon Lumby is an Anglican priest: he has been  Archdeacon of Limerick, Ardfert and Aghadoe since 2016.

Lumby was born in 1956 and educated at Hull University, The Open University and St John's College, Nottingham. He was  ordained in 2004. His first post was a curacy at Wirksworth. After that he held incumbencies at Thorpe Constantine, Clifton Campville and Killarney.

References

1966 births
Living people
Archdeacons of Limerick, Ardfert and Aghadoe
Alumni of the University of Hull
Alumni of the Open University
Alumni of St John's College, Nottingham